Kaunghein is a village and village tract in Hkamti Township in Hkamti District in the Sagaing Region of northwestern Burma. At the time of the 2014 census the village tract had a population of 1251 people of which 670 were men and 581 were women. 208 households were recorded.

References

External links
Maplandia World Gazetteer

Populated places in Hkamti District
Village tracts of Hkamti Township